The Ulster Shield is the premier knock-out competition for ladies' hockey teams in the Ulster province of Ireland. It is one of the oldest ladies' hockey competitions in the world, with the first competition being held in 1896. Ireland was the first country to form a national association when the Irish Ladies Hockey Union was formed in 1894.

From 1903 until the mid-1980s the winners qualified to represent Ulster in the Irish Senior Cup.

The most successful club is Pegasus with 28 wins from 34 final appearances.

Performance by club

FINALS

(Records are incomplete)

1890s

1900s

1910s

1920s

1930s

1940s

1950s

1960s

1970s

1980s

1990s

2000s

2010s

2020s

Sources

External links
 Ulster Womens Hockey Union

Field hockey competitions in Ulster
Women's field hockey competitions in Ireland
1896 establishments in Ireland